Green Pond is a small area in Polk County, Florida, south of Clermont, Florida and north of Polk City, Florida, on the edge of the Green Swamp.

Overview
The area was settled by many families in the early-to-mid-19th century. Some common surnames (last names) in the area were "Judy," "Grimmes," and "Roberts."

The family with the largest number of descendants in the area is likely "Judy." It's an Irish name dating back to the 14th century. In 1867, William Judy moved to the Green Pond area with one son (Jasper). Both married local Cherokee women. Many family descendants still raise oranges in the area. The site is also a trailhead for the General James A. Van Fleet State Trail.

References

External links 
Ghosttowns.com website

Former populated places in Polk County, Florida
Former populated places in Florida